Alicante–Elche Miguel Hernández Airport, is an international airport located about  southwest of the city of Alicante and about  east of the city of Elche in Spain. Alicante–Elche is one of the main airports in south-eastern Spain, serving both the southern part of the Valencian Community and the Region of Murcia.

The airport is a base for Air Nostrum, Norwegian Air Shuttle, Ryanair and Vueling. Passenger traffic has increased significantly in the last decade, beating its own yearly record since 2013 to date; in 2019 it set its new consecutive record at 15 million passengers. It is one of the 50 busiest in Europe and was Spain's fifth busiest airport in 2019. Up to 80% of all passenger flights are international. The largest numbers of passengers arrive from the United Kingdom, Germany, the Netherlands, Norway, Belgium and Sweden. Popular domestic destinations are Madrid, Palma de Mallorca and Barcelona.

History
 
El Altet airport opened on 4 May 1967, replacing the older aerodrome La Rabassa that had served Alicante since 1936. It took its name after the El Altet area (a part of Elche's countryside) where it was built. The first commercial flight that landed at the airport was Convair Metropolitan by Aviaco. In November 1969, Iberia established regular connections to Madrid and Barcelona.

Historically, up until 2003, Iberia was the leading airline at the airport. With the decline of conventional airlines, low-cost EasyJet took the lead in 2004. Transatlantic service commenced from Alicante in June 2006, when an Avianca Boeing 767 touched down from Bogotá, Colombia. Alicante served as a stop on the outbound portion of the airline's once-weekly Bogotá-Barcelona flight. Two years later, Avianca announced it would eliminate the halt in Alicante after the Spanish aviation authorities granted it permission to fly nonstop to Barcelona.

In November 2007, Ryanair, the largest European low-cost airline established a base at Alicante. It has since grown to become one of the leading carriers at the airport, and by 2011 it had increased its presence further with eleven based aircraft, 62 routes, and had carried more than 3 million passengers.

In March 2011, Alicante-Elche's current terminal opened, which replaced the previous 2 terminals.

The airport is located within Elche's comarca and so there had been a historical petition from Elche to include the city's name in the official name of the airport. On 12 July 2013, the name of the airport was officially changed from Aeropuerto de Alicante to Aeropuerto de Alicante–Elche with the IATA airport code (ALC) remaining unchanged.

In 2015, the number of passengers increased by 5,1% to 10,574,484. The passenger traffic has increased in every year since 2000, with the exception of 2009, 2012 and 2020. By 2015 the largest number of passengers was carried by Ryanair (2,992,984), followed by EasyJet (1,285,221) and Vueling (1,093,494). Norwegian Air Shuttle (893,319) is the distant fourth.

On 23 July 2016, the airport registered its busiest day of operations to date, handling 347 flights—with an average of one flight every 3 minutes—and about 58,000 passengers in a single day.

In 2020, the airport recorded more than 11 million less passengers due to the COVID-19 pandemic.

In 2021, the airport was renamed again, this time to Aeropuerto de Alicante–Elche Miguel Hernández, to mark the 110th anniversary of the birth of Spanish poet and playwright Miguel Hernández.

Terminals

Terminal N is the only terminal currently in public use.

Terminal N
In November 2004, the airport's operator Aena approved plans to construct a new terminal for ALC, as a response to the airport's continuous passenger growth. Construction began in 2005, with an initial planned completion of 2009/10. After more than 5 years of construction, Terminal N (Nueva Área Terminal) officially opened on 23 March 2011. All flight operations were transferred to this terminal on the following day. The first flight to depart from Terminal N was a Ryanair flight to Memmingen. Terminal N was constructed to the east of terminals 1 and 2 and includes 96 check-in desks, 40 gates, including 15 with airbridges, and 16 baggage claim carousels. The terminal is split into two areas, the processor where the C Gates are held, and the dock where the majority of B Gates are located. Flights within the Schengen Area use both areas of the terminal while flights to non-Schengen destinations only use the dock.

In October 2011, Ryanair terminated 31 routes after airport operator Aena demanded that Ryanair pay over €2 million a year for the use of Terminal N's air bridges, a facility that Ryanair had called "unnecessary" as the airline prefers to use mobile stairways for boarding and disembarking. However, Ryanair have since re-increased their number of routes from the airport.

Former terminals

By 1970, the airport was handling close to 1 million passengers, which prompted the construction of a new passenger terminal, the first phase opening in 1972 for international flights and the second phase opening in 1975 for domestic flights. In 1978, passenger numbers exceeded 2 million. In 1980, the runway was extended to three kilometres.

During the 1990s, the terminals were modernised and expanded in order to accommodate the airport's rising passenger numbers. A new control tower and office building, together with operation and business centres, were constructed and five air bridges were installed to facilitate boarding. Car parking capacity was increased, the aircraft apron was expanded and a new runway exit was also constructed.

While construction on Terminal N was underway, Aena approved plans for an extension to the existing terminal, which would act as an auxiliary until the new terminal was complete. The adjacent extension opened in January 2007 and was named Terminal 2 (T2) and the existing terminal was renamed Terminal 1 (T1).

Terminals 1 and 2 have remained closed, yet structurally intact, since 2011. There has since been speculation that they may reopen in the future. Terminal 1 (T1) had 39 check-in desks, 11 departure gates (5 with airbridges) and 9 baggage claim carousels, while terminal 2 (T2) had 14 check-in desks, 6 gates (none with airbridges), and 2 baggage claim carousels.

Airlines and destinations
The following airlines operate regular scheduled and charter flights at Alicante–Elche Airport:

Statistics

Annual traffic

Busiest routes

Ground transport
Alicante airport is accessible by buses, taxis, and private cars on automobile road N-338. New car parking was opened in 2011 together with the new terminal. employs a modern sensor system with displays.

Rail link
The new terminal of the airport was built with space allocated for a railway station and an Alicante Tram stop. In 2019, the Generalitat Valenciana granted €50,000 towards a feasibility study in connecting Alicante Airport to the rail network. 
 The same year, the Ministry of Development put out to tender the contract to build the airport rail link to form part of the Cercanías Murcia/Alicante commuter rail network.

Bus station
Alicante airport has one bus stop for all the bus lines operating at the airport. The bus stop at Alicante airport is located outside the departures area of the terminal on level 2. The airport is connected with the city of Alicante by the C6 bus line. There are also hourly bus services to Benidorm and Torrevieja.

Accidents and incidents
In September 2013 a baby died at the airport shortly after arriving with relatives on a flight from London after the child's mother placed the baby in a carrier onto a conveyor belt used for bulky luggage items. The belt activated due to having detected the carrier's weight, and the baby became tangled in the machine's rollers.
On April 10, 2017 a Jet2 Boeing 757-200  suffered a tailstrike during landing, damaging the area around the lower tail. The Spanish Civil Aviation Accident and Incident Investigation Commission determined the copilot, who was flying, left the nose too high during the landing and the captain failed to intervene. The copilot, who was on his final day of training after working for Jet2 for two years, reported to investigators he felt stressed due to pressure from Jet2 and was sleeping poorly. Jet2 fired the copilot following the accident.
In January 2020 a fire in the international terminal's roof caused a 24-hour closure of the airport, with the diversion of 160 flights.

See also
Transport in Spain
ENAIRE

References

External links

Official website

Airports in the Valencian Community
Airports established in 1967
Buildings and structures in the Province of Alicante
Articles which contain graphical timelines
Elche
1967 establishments in Spain